The 46th Street station is a local station on the IND Queens Boulevard Line of the New York City Subway. Located at the intersection of 46th Street and Broadway in Astoria, Queens, it is served by the M train on weekdays, the R train at all times except nights, and the E and F trains at night.

History 

The Queens Boulevard Line was one of the first lines built by the city-owned Independent Subway System (IND), and stretches between the IND Eighth Avenue Line in Manhattan and 179th Street and Hillside Avenue in Jamaica, Queens. The Queens Boulevard Line was in part financed by a Public Works Administration (PWA) loan and grant of $25 million. One of the proposed stations would have been located at 46th Street.

The station entrances to 48th Street did not open until some time after October 1933, when the Astoria Heights Taxpayers Association circulated petitions demanding that these entrances be opened.

Station layout 

This underground station has two tracks and two side platforms. The express tracks on the IND Queens Boulevard Line, used by the E train during daytime hours and the F train at all times, run via a separate routing under Northern Boulevard.

Both platforms have a Grape trim line with a black border and mosaic name tablets reading "46TH ST." in white sans-serif lettering on a black background and Grape border. Small tile captions reading "46TH ST" in white on black run below the trim line, and directional signs in the same style are present under some of the name tablets. Royal purple I-beam columns run along both platforms at regular intervals, alternating ones having the standard black station name plate with white lettering.

Exits

Both platforms have one same-level fare control area at either ends and there are no crossovers or crossunders. The full-time side is at the west (railroad south) end of the Manhattan-bound platform. It has a turnstile bank, token booth, and one staircase to the northwest corner of 46th Street and Broadway. The fare control area on the same end of Forest Hills-bound platform has a part-time turnstile bank and token booth (with two High Entry-Exit Turnstiles providing access to and from the station at all times) and one staircase to the southwest corner of 46th Street and Broadway.

The fare control area on the east (railroad north) end of the Manhattan-bound platform has a part-time turnstile bank and customer assistance booth (with two High Entry-Exit Turnstiles providing access to and from the station at all times) and one staircase going up to the north side of Newtown Road between Broadway and 48th Street. The fare control area on this end of the Forest Hills-bound platform is un-staffed, containing full height turnstiles and one staircase going up to the southeast corner of Broadway and 48th Street.

There is evidence of a provisional fare control area at the center of both platforms leading to 47th Street. The Forest Hills-bound platform has a set of doors leading to an employee-only facility while the Manhattan-bound platform has a wide fenced off area. Stairs to the street were never constructed.

References

External links 

 
 Station Reporter — R Train
 Station Reporter — M Train
 The Subway Nut — 46th Street Pictures 
 46th Street entrance from Google Maps Street View
 48th Street entrance from Google Maps Street View
 Newton Road entrance from Google Maps Street View
 Platforms from Google Maps Street View

IND Queens Boulevard Line stations
1933 establishments in New York City
New York City Subway stations in Queens, New York
Railway stations in the United States opened in 1933
Astoria, Queens